Capitan High School is a public high school located in Capitan, New Mexico, United States. The school has an enrollment of approximately 150 students in grades 9–12.  Athletic teams are known as the Fighting Tigers and the school colors are orange and black.

References 

Educational institutions in the United States with year of establishment missing
Public high schools in New Mexico
Schools in Lincoln County, New Mexico